Martin Stropnický (born 19 December 1956) is a Czech politician and diplomat who served as the minister of Foreign Affairs from December 2017 to June 2018, and was previously minister of Defence from 2014 to 2017. From 2 January 1998 to 22 July 1998 he also served as the minister of Culture. Before entering politics, he was an actor, songwriter, author and director.

Career
Stropnický graduated from the Theatre Faculty of the Academy of Performing Arts in Prague (DAMU) in 1980, and worked in different theatres in Prague over the next decade including the Prague Municipal Theatre and the Vinohrady Theatre.

In 1990 he began working at the Czechoslovak Ministry of Foreign Affairs (which became the Czech Ministry of Foreign Affairs two years later). He graduated from the Diplomatic Academy of Vienna in 1991, and subsequently served as the Czech Ambassador to Portugal (1993–94) and then Italy (1994-97).

For a six-month period from January to July 1998, Stropnický was appointed Czech Minister of Culture in the caretaker government of Josef Tošovský. He subsequently returned to the diplomatic service, serving as Czech Ambassador to the Vatican from 1999 to 2003, before returning to the Vinohrady Theatre as artistic director.

He was elected to the Chamber of Deputies in 2013 and served as Minister of Defence in Bohuslav Sobotka's Cabinet. Following the 2017 legislative election, which saw Andrej Babiš taking over as Prime Minister, Stropnický became Minister for Foreign Affairs, as well as Deputy Prime Minister, assuming both positions on 13 December 2017. However, Babiš' government lost a confidence vote in the Chamber of Deputies, and Stropnický was succeeded on 27 June 2018 by Jan Hamáček.

On 1 October 2018, Stropnický resigned from Parliament to return to the diplomatic service as Czech Ambassador to Israel.

Personal life
Stropnický is married. In addition to Czech, he speaks English, French, and Italian, with a passive knowledge of Portuguese, Russian, and German. Stropnický is the father of former Green Party councillor Matěj Stropnický.

References

External links 
 

|-

|-

1956 births
Living people
Academy of Performing Arts in Prague alumni
Czech male stage actors
Politicians from Prague
ANO 2011 Government ministers
ANO 2011 MPs
Defence ministers of the Czech Republic
Culture ministers of the Czech Republic
Foreign Ministers of the Czech Republic
Ambassadors of the Czech Republic to Israel
Members of the Chamber of Deputies of the Czech Republic (2013–2017)
Members of the Chamber of Deputies of the Czech Republic (2017–2021)
Recipients of the Thalia Award